The 2013 Capital One Bowl, the 67th edition of the game, was a post-season American college football bowl game, held on January 1, 2013 at the Florida Citrus Bowl in Orlando, Florida as part of the 2012–13 NCAA Bowl season.

The game, which was broadcast at 1:00 p.m. EST on ABC, featured the #7 (BCS) Georgia Bulldogs from the Southeastern Conference versus the #16 (BCS) Nebraska Cornhuskers from the Big Ten Conference.

Entering the game both teams suffered a loss at their respective conference championship games.  The Georgia Bulldogs, winners of the SEC Eastern Division, were ranked #3 in the BCS going into the game.  They lost to #2 Alabama 32–28.   Meanwhile, the Nebraska Cornhuskers, winners of the Big Ten Legends Division, were ranked #12 going into the game.  They lost to unranked Wisconsin 70–31.

Prior to this bowl, Nebraska had played Georgia just once in football.  During the 1969 Sun Bowl, the  9–2 Nebraska Cornhuskers defeated the  5–5–1 Georgia Bulldogs by a score of 45–6.  This season was of note in that it featured 31-year-old Tom Osborne in his first year as an offensive coordinator for Nebraska.

Game summary

Scoring summary

Statistics

Game notes

Depth chart

Depth chart

References

Capital One Bowl
Citrus Bowl (game)
Georgia Bulldogs football bowl games
Nebraska Cornhuskers football bowl games
Capital One Bowl
Capital One Bowl